Linda Connolly, Ormskirk, Lancs (born 30 April 1952) is a former pair skater who represented Great Britain.  With partner Colin Taylforth, she finished 9th at the 1971 European Figure Skating Championships and 14th at the 1972 Winter Olympics. Linda Connolly won the British pair’s championship 3 times, first in 1965 at the age of 13 and then in 1970 & 1971 before going onto the European & Olympic championships.

References

 Sports-Reference profile

British female pair skaters
Figure skaters at the 1972 Winter Olympics
Olympic figure skaters of Great Britain
1952 births
Living people
Place of birth missing (living people)